Malvinas 2032  is a video game developed and published by Sabarasa Entertainment.

Plot and gameplay 
The player takes control of Argentinian forces and tries to take back the Falkland Islands from Britain. It takes place in 2032, on the 50th anniversary of the Falklands War.

Development 
Javier Otaegui serves as the project lead. In 1996 he read in the local newspaper that Conde Entertainment Software had just won an international prize for real-time strategy Regnum, the first Argentinian CD release which sold over  10,000 copies. Otaegui was inspired by this moment, later recalling that he thought "If someone has already made a game in Argentina, maybe I can do the same". The game took three years of development and led to Otaegui starting his own company, Sabarasa. He considered it a "tribute" to the combatants killed in the war.

The game's development began in March 1996, taking around 3.5 years to complete. During that time the team created their gaming engine and converted it from DOS to DirectX.

GarageDeveloper International published the game in English.

Release 
In March 2001, LeTemps announced the game was to be released in English in the next few weeks.

Critical reception 
Idnes gave it a scathing review. Absolute Games felt the title had no redeeming qualities. JDeJuegos argues it's the first and only attempt from the Argentinian video gaming industry to create an RTS.

Legacy 
Its legacy is in being one of the first Argentinian video gaming successes, alongside contemporary titles such as Yo, Matías, and Argentum Online.

References

External links 

 BBC audio clip on game development
Interview on page 9 of REPLAY magazine
Main page
Interview at Supleinternet
Juegos Online article

See also 
 Cultural impact of the Falklands War

1999 video games
Falklands War video games
Real-time strategy video games
Video games developed in Argentina
Video games set in South America
Video games set in the future
Windows games
Windows-only games